Charles Clarke (November 28, 1826 – April 6, 1909) was speaker of the Legislature of Ontario in 1880-1883 and served as Liberal MLA for Wellington Centre from 1871 to 1886 and for Wellington East from 1886 to 1891.

He was born in Lincoln, England, in 1826, studied there with George Boole, was apprenticed as a draper and came to Canada West in 1844. He joined his mother and stepfather on a farm in the Niagara District and later moved with them to Elora. He opened a store with his stepfather there. He was editor for the Journal and Express newspapers in Hamilton and helped establish the Elora Backwoodsman. He served on the town council for Elora and was reeve from 1859 to 1864 and from 1867 to 1868. He commanded a local militia unit during the Fenian raids, becoming lieutenant-colonel. In 1874, he helped introduce legislation that established the secret ballot for elections in the province. He became clerk of the legislature in January 1892 and served until 1907. He died in Elora in 1909.

External links

J A Gemmill (ed), The Canadian Parliamentary Companion, 1891, page 214; Ottawa : J. Durie, 1891.
 
Charles Clarke fonds, Archives of Ontario

1826 births
1909 deaths
People from Lincoln, England
English emigrants to pre-Confederation Ontario
Speakers of the Legislative Assembly of Ontario
Ontario Liberal Party MPPs
People of the Fenian raids
Mayors of places in Ontario
People from Centre Wellington
Immigrants to the Province of Canada